Antonio Maria Sartori (died 1556) was a Roman Catholic prelate who served as Bishop of Teano (1535–1556).

Biography
On 30 April 1535, Antonio Maria Sartori was appointed by Pope Paul III as Bishop of Teano.
He served as Bishop of Teano until his death in 1556.

References

External links and additional sources

16th-century Italian Roman Catholic bishops
1556 deaths
Bishops appointed by Pope Paul III